Ivar Schmidt (born 28 December 1946) was an Australian politician who represented the South Australian House of Assembly seat of Mawson for the Liberal Party from 1979 to 1982.

References

Members of the South Australian House of Assembly
1946 births
Living people
Liberal Party of Australia members of the Parliament of South Australia